LiU AIF FK is a Swedish football club located in Linköping.

Background
LiU AIF FK currently plays in Division 4 Östergötland Västra which is the sixth tier of Swedish football. They play their home matches at the Ryd konstgräsplan in Linköping. The club was previously known as FC Innerstan.

LiU AIF FK are affiliated to Östergötlands Fotbollförbund. FC Innerstan played in the 2010 Svenska Cupen but lost 2–3 at home to Myresjö IF in the preliminary round.

Season to season

Footnotes

External links
 LiU AIF FK – Official website

Football clubs in Östergötland County